{{DISPLAYTITLE:C19H23N3}}
The molecular formula C19H23N3 (molar mass: 293.41 g/mol, exact mass: 293.1892 u) may refer to:

 Amitraz
 Binedaline, or binodaline